Highfield School may refer to:

The Highfield School, a secondary school in Letchworth in Hertfordshire, England
Highfield School, an independent preparatory school in Liphook in Hampshire, England
Highfield School, Chatham, Kent, England, a co-educational secondary school closed in 1990, pupils transferring to the newly established Thomas Aveling School
Highfield School for Boys, an independent preparatory school in Hamilton, Ontario, Canada, now merged with other schools to form Hillfield Strathallan College